Joseph Screen (born 27 November 1972 in Chesterfield, Derbyshire), is a former British international speedway rider. His major speedway honours include winning the World Under-21 Championship in 1993, the British Championship in 1996 and 2004, and the British League Riders' Championship in 1992. Screen also competed in grasstrack and longtrack motorcycle racing and is a former British Masters champion.

Career
Screen began riding motorcycles at the age of four, and gained his early experience on a 50cc motocross bike. After competing in motocross and grasstrack he started to compete in speedway at the age of fourteen.

Screen started his speedway career with the Belle Vue Aces in 1989 in the top tier of British League racing. In 1994 he transferred to the Bradford Dukes, where he spent the next four seasons. A year back at Belle Vue Aces in 1998 was followed by a solitary season with the Hull Vikings. The next four seasons were spent with the Eastbourne Eagles before returning 'home' to Belle Vue in 2003, and enjoying a testimonial season the following year.

After being released by Belle Vue following the 2008 season, Screen joined Elite League champions the Poole Pirates on loan for 2009, after losing 27 lbs in response to concerns over his weight. Despite improving his average over the season he was not retained by Poole. After failing to get an Elite League offer he agreed a two-year deal with Premier League Glasgow Tigers, but an appeal against his converted 12-point greensheet average was turned down, almost forcing him to retire. He was given a lifeline with a short-term deal with Wolverhampton Wolves for 2010, until Adam Skornicki returned from injury. His spell with Wolves saw his average drop sufficiently to fit into the Glasgow Tigers team, which he joined in May 2010, signing as a club asset for 2011, when he captained Glasgow to win both the Premier League Championship and the Premier League Pairs (alongside James Grieves). He also rode for Birmingham Brummies in the Elite League in 2011 and 2012 in a doubling-up capacity. In 2013 he rode for Coventry Bees in the Elite League as cover for the injured Adam Roynon, but after getting injured himself, his tenure there was short-lived.

Screen was the 1993 World Under-21 Champion. He made his debut for England in 1991 but did not ride for the renamed Great Britain team until 2002. Screen has twice been British Champion, in 1996 and 2004. He rode in the Speedway Grand Prix series between 1996 until 2001 (when he had to withdraw after breaking his thigh) and as a wild card in the British Grand Prix in 2002, appearing in 21 Grands Prix and scoring a total of 159 points.

Screen has also been involved in coaching young speedway riders and ran an academy at Buxton.

His grasstrack career included winning both the British 350cc Championship and the British 350cc Best Pairs in 1989, reaching the World Longtrack Final in 1993 and 1994, and British Masters Championship wins in 1992 and 1995.

Screen announced in June 2013 that he would be retiring from racing at the end of the season after 25 years in British league speedway, but a hand injury sustained in August brought his season to a premature end.

World Final Appearances

Individual World Championship
 1993 -  Pocking, Rottalstadion - 13th - 5pts

World Pairs Championship
 1993 -  Vojens, Speedway Center (with Martin Dugard / Gary Havelock) - 4th - 17pts (9)

World Team Cup
 1992 -  Kumla, Kumla Speedway - 3rd - 31pts (2)
 1993 -  Coventry, Brandon Stadium - 4th - 14pts (5)
 1999 -  Pardubice, Svítkova Stadion - 4th - 29+2pts (4+2)
 2000 -  Coventry, Brandon Stadium - 2nd - 40+0pts (12)

World Cup
 2005 -  Wrocław, Olympic Stadium - 4th - 25pts (1)

Individual Under-21 World Championship
 1991 -  Coventry, Brandon Stadium - 5th - 10pts
 1992 -  Pfaffenhofen, Speedway Stadion Pfaffenhofen - 3rd - 13pts
 1993 -  Pardubice, Svítkova Stadion - Winner - 14+3pts

Speedway Grand Prix results

World Longtrack Championship

Finalist
 1993 -  Muhldorf - 11th (9pts)
 1994 -  Marianske Lazne - 12th (8pts)

Grand-Prix
 2000 - 16th (20pts) 1 app

British Masters Grasstrack Championship

First

 1992  @ Wimborne & North Berks
 1995  @ North Berks & Severn Valley
 2003  @ Astra

Second

 1999  @ North Berks
 2002  @ Wainfleet

External links
 http://grasstrackgb.co.uk/joe-screen/

References 

1972 births
Living people
British speedway riders
Sportspeople from Chesterfield, Derbyshire
British Speedway Championship winners
Polonia Bydgoszcz riders
Belle Vue Aces riders
Hull Vikings riders
Eastbourne Eagles riders
Bradford Dukes riders
English expatriate sportspeople in Poland
Expatriate speedway riders in Poland
Individual Speedway Long Track World Championship riders
English expatriate sportspeople in Sweden